Jeletzkytes is an extinct genus of scaphatoid ammonite from the Upper Cretaceous (Maastrichtian) of North America named and described by Riccardi, 1983. In overall form Jeletzkytes closely resembles the genus Scaphites.

A number of species have been described in the genus including:
J. brevis
J. compressus
J. crassus
J. criptonodosus
J. dorfi
J. furnivali
J. nebrascensis
J. nodosus
J. spedeni

References

 Jeletzkytes, Paleobiology Database. 13 Mar. 2013. 
 Neil H. Landman, Karl M Waage (Karl Mensch); Scaphitid ammonites of the Upper Cretaceous (Maastrichtian) Fox Hills Formation in South Dakota and Wyoming. Bulletin of the AMNH ; no. 215, 1993. 

Ammonitida genera
Scaphitidae
Late Cretaceous ammonites of North America